The Europe Zone was one of the two regional zones of the 1939 International Lawn Tennis Challenge.

20 teams entered the Europe Zone, with the winner going on to compete in the Inter-Zonal Final against the winner of the America Zone. Yugoslavia defeated Germany in the final, and went on to face Australia in the Inter-Zonal Final.

Draw

First round

Germany vs. Switzerland

Poland vs. Netherlands

Romania vs. Hungary

Yugoslavia vs. Ireland

Second round

Great Britain vs. New Zealand

France vs. China

Sweden vs. Denmark

Poland vs. Germany

Hungary vs. Yugoslavia

Italy vs. Monaco

Belgium vs. India

Quarterfinals

Great Britain vs. France

Germany vs. Sweden

Italy vs. Yugoslavia

Belgium vs. Norway

Semifinals

Germany vs. Great Britain

Yugoslavia vs. Belgium

Final

Yugoslavia vs. Germany

Notes

References

External links
Davis Cup official website

Davis Cup Europe/Africa Zone
Europe Zone
International Lawn Tennis Challenge